Eric Anderson (born April 15, 1993) is an American professional basketball player who last played for FC Porto in the Liga Portuguesa de Basquetebol. He played college basketball for the University of New Haven before playing professionally in Germany, Luxembourg, Japan, Argentina and Israel.

Early life and college career
Anderson attended Newark Tech High School in Newark, New Jersey, where he was named an All-Conference, All-County and All-State selection in 2010–11 as a senior.

Anderson played college basketball at the University of New Haven, where he played for head coach Ted Hotaling. He was named the Northeast-10 Conference Defensive Player of the Year for three consecutive seasons. Anderson averaged an NCAA Division II best 13.1 rebounds, to go with 16.7 points, 3.8 assists and 1.5 blocks per game in his senior year.

Professional career

2015–16 season
On August 3, 2015, Anderson started his professional career with Gladiators Trier of the German ProA. In 10 games, he averaged 10.5 points, 8.0 rebounds, 1.5 assists and 1.0 blocks per game.

On December 14, 2015, Anderson signed with T71 Dudelange of Luxembourg's Total League.  In 18 games with Dudelange during the 2016–17 season, he finished second on the team with a 51.3 percent effort from the field (117-of-228), averaging 17.1 points per game. He also pulled in a team-best 12.6 rebounds per contest and led the team with 2.2 blocks per outing. Anderson helped lead Dudelange to a 23–7 overall record. On May 16, 2016, Anderson was named the Total League Defensive Player of the Year.

2016–17 season
On August 23, 2016, Anderson signed with Tokyo Cinq Rêves of the Japanese B.League. In 26 B.League games played during the 2016–17 season, he averaged 13.5 points, 9.9 rebounds, 1.5 assists, 1.2 steals and 1.5 blocks per game. On February 27, 2017, Anderson parted ways with Tokyo Cinq Rêves to join T71 Dudelange for a second stint, signing for the rest of the season.

2017–18 season
On October 11, 2017, Anderson signed with Villa Mitre of the Argentine LLA, the second division of the Argentine league system. On March 11, 2018, Anderson recorded a career-high and a double-double of 35 points and 16 rebounds, shooting 14-of-18 from the field, along with three blocks and three steals in a 90–79 win over Gimnasia La Plata.  In 46 games played for Villa Mitre, he averaged 17.9 points, 11.6 rebounds and 2.3 assists per game with the team falling to Estudiantes de Olavarría in the quarterfinal round.

2018–19 season
On May 9, 2018, Anderson signed with Obras Sanitarias of the Argentine LNB. In 42 games played during the 2018–19 season, he finished the season as the league fourth-leading rebounder with 8.9 rebounds per game, to go with 14.5 points, 1 assist and 1.3 blocks per game.

2019–20 season
On June 26, 2019, Anderson signed a one-year deal with Maccabi Haifa of the Israeli Premier League. On October 10, 2019, Anderson has been ruled for three months after he suffered a foot injury during a pre-season match against the Memphis Grizzlies. He averaged 4.5 points and 3 rebounds per game.

2020–21 season
On August 18, 2020, Anderson signed with FC Porto in the Liga Portuguesa de Basquetebol.

References

External links
 New Haven Chargers bio
 RealGM profile

1993 births
Living people
American expatriate basketball people in Argentina
American expatriate basketball people in Austria
American expatriate basketball people in Israel
American expatriate basketball people in Japan
American expatriate basketball people in Luxembourg
American men's basketball players
Basketball players from Newark, New Jersey
Centers (basketball)
FC Porto basketball players
Maccabi Haifa B.C. players
New Haven Chargers men's basketball players
Obras Sanitarias basketball players
Power forwards (basketball)
Tokyo Cinq Rêves players